San Juan de Tarucani District (Aymara Tarujani, taruja deer, -ni a suffix, "the one with deer") is one of 29 districts of the province Arequipa in Peru.

Geography 
Other mountains are listed below:

See also 
 Chinaqucha
 Lake Salinas
 Salinas and Aguada Blanca National Reservation
 Urququcha

References

1962 establishments in Peru
States and territories established in 1962
Districts of the Arequipa Province
Districts of the Arequipa Region